Malta Storm is a 1989 video game published by Simulations Canada.

Gameplay
Malta Storm is a game in which the World War II Axis effort to subdue the British on the island of Malta is covered.

Reception
Sam Punnett reviewed the game for Computer Gaming World, and stated that "As a pure entertainment product, many will feel the limitations placed by Malta Storm'''s design and lack of chrome makes it a less than desirable game for the casual gamer. As a command study, however, Malta Storm'' has plenty to offer aficionados of military history who are more concerned with strategy than presentation."

References

1989 video games
Amiga games
Atari ST games
Computer wargames
DOS games
Naval video games
Simulations Canada video games
Turn-based strategy video games
Video games developed in Canada
Video games set in Malta